George Williams may refer to:

Academics 
George Williams (priest) (1814–1878), English academic and antiquary
George C. F. Williams (1857–1933), American medical doctor, genealogist and historian
George G. Williams (1902–2000), professor of English and creative writing at Rice University
George Huntston Williams (1914–2000), professor of Unitarian history at Harvard University
George H. Williams (educator) (1918–2003), president of American University
George Christopher Williams (1926–2010), American biologist
George E. Williams (geologist), Australian geologist
George Williams (lawyer) (born 1969), Australian legal academic

Entertainment
George Augustus Williams (1814–1901), British landscape painter 
George A. Williams (actor) (1854–1936), American actor of the silent film era
George Emlyn Williams (1905–1987), Welsh dramatist and actor
George Williams (musician) (1917–1988), arranger/composer for big bands
George Brigars Williams (1929–2016), Ghanaian actor
George C. Williams (cinematographer), Indian cinematographer
George Williams (Desperate Housewives), television character
George W. Williams, vaudeville performer and recording artist, see George Williams and Bessie Brown

Politics
George Williams (died 1556), MP for Grantham
George Williams (British politician) (1765–1850), British army officer and Liberal politician
George Hawkins Williams (1818–1889), American politician and lawyer
George Henry Williams (1823–1910), United States Attorney General and a United States Senator from Oregon
George E. Williams (New Jersey politician), member of the New Jersey General Assembly
George E. Williams (New York politician) (1828–1914), New York assemblyman, 1879
George Washington Williams (1849–1891), author and Ohio state legislator
George F. Williams (1852–1932), United States Representative from Massachusetts
George A. Williams (Nebraska politician) (1864–1946), lieutenant governor of Nebraska, 1925–1931
George Norris Williams (1866–1949), acting Commissioner of Yukon, 1915 to 1916
George Williams (Michigan politician) (1869–1934), Michigan state senator
George Howard Williams (1871–1963), U.S. Senator from Missouri
George S. Williams (1877–1961), U.S. Representative from Delaware
George Hara Williams (1894–1945), Saskatchewan politician

Sports

American football
George Williams (American football), head coach at Kansas Wesleyan University in 1916
George Williams III (born 1975), American football defensive lineman

Association football
George Williams (footballer, born 1862) (1862–?), Chirk F.C. and Wales
George Williams (footballer, born 1879) (1879–1916), Wrexham A.F.C., West Bromwich Albion F.C. and Wales
George Williams (footballer, born 1881) (1881–1946), Australian rules footballer for St Kilda
George Williams (footballer, born 1882) (1882–1939), English footballer for Wolverhampton Wanderers
George Williams (footballer, born 1897) (1897–1957), English footballer with Southampton and Exeter City
Robert Williams (footballer, born 1932) (George Robert Williams, 1932–2003), English footballer for Mansfield Town
George Williams (footballer, born 1993), English footballer for Cambridge United
George Williams (footballer, born 1995), Wales international footballer for Barrow
Geraint Williams (born 1962), Welsh football manager nicknamed "George"

Baseball
George Williams (Negro leagues) (1864–1918), African American baseball player, Cuban Giants from 1885 
George Williams (infielder) (1939–2009), American baseball player
George Williams (catcher) (born 1969), American baseball player

Rugby
George Williams (rugby union) (1856–1925), New Zealand rugby union player
George Williams (rugby league) (born 1994), English rugby league player

Other sports
George Williams (Australian footballer) (1871–1937), Australian rules footballer for Collingwood
George Williams (cricketer) (1880–?), English cricketer
George Williams (basketball) (1899–1961), American college basketball player in the 1920s
George Williams (racewalker) (1935–2016), British racewalker
George Williams (umpire), West Indian cricket umpire in the 1950s

Other
Gilly Williams (George James Williams, 1719–1805), English official, wit, and letter writer
George Williams (physician) (c. 1762–1834), English physician and librarian
George Williams (died 1882), leader of the Church of the Firstborn who identified himself as a reincarnation of the prophet Cainan
George Williams (philanthropist) (1821–1905), English founder of the YMCA
George Forrester Williams (1837–1920), a Gibraltar-born soldier and military adviser who became managing editor of the New York Times
George C. Williams (Medal of Honor) (1839–1926), Union Army during the American Civil War
George Williams (Idaho architect) (1860–1929), American architect
George Washington Williams (naval officer) (1869–1925), US Navy officer
George Clark Williams (1878–1958), Queen's Counsel and Justice of the Peace
George Hopkins Williams II (1915–2006), aviation history collector
George Williams College (Chicago), a campus of Aurora University, Illinois
Sir George Williams Campus of Concordia University, Montreal, Quebec, Canada
George Williams (fireboat), see Fireboats of Portland, Oregon

See also 
George W. Williams (disambiguation)